Kagiyama (written:  lit. "key mountain") is a Japanese surname. Notable people with the surname include:

, Japanese figure skater
, Japanese figure skater

Fictional characters
, a character in the Touhou Project video game series

Japanese-language surnames